Heinz Junga (born 22 June 1943) is a German former freestyle swimmer. He competed in the men's 1500 metre freestyle at the 1964 Summer Olympics.

References

External links
 

1943 births
Living people
German male freestyle swimmers
Olympic swimmers of the United Team of Germany
Swimmers at the 1964 Summer Olympics
Swimmers from Berlin
20th-century German people
21st-century German people